The Oregon Trail is a 1939 American Western film serial starring Johnny Mack Brown and released by Universal Pictures.

Plot
Jeff Scott is sent to investigate problems with wagon trains attempting to make the journey to Oregon. Sam Morgan, the representative of an eastern syndicate, has full control of the fur trade. Morgan sends his henchmen, under lead-henchman Bull Bragg, to stop the latest wagon train in order to maintain control of the fur trade in the area.

Cast
Johnny Mack Brown as Jeff Scott, in the last of four serials Brown made for Universal.
Louise Stanley as Margaret Mason
Fuzzy Knight as Deadwood Hawkins, Scott's sidekick
Bill Cody, Jr. as Jimmie Clark
Edward LeSaint as John Mason
James Blaine as Sam Morgan, villain
Charles Stevens as "Breed"
Jack C. Smith as Bull Bragg, Sam Morgan's main henchman
Roy Barcroft as Colonel Custer
Charles Murphy as Tompkins
Colin Kenny as Slade, a henchman
Forrest Taylor as Daggett, a henchman
Jim Toney as Idaho Ike

Production

Stunts
Yakima Canutt (archive footage)
Cliff Lyons
Tom Steele

Chapter titles
 The Renegade's Revenge
 The Flaming Forest
 The Brink of Disaster
 Thundering Doom
 The Stampede
 Indian Vengeance
 Trail of Treachery
 Redskin Revenge
 The Avalanche of Doom
 The Plunge of Peril
 Trapped in the Flames
 The Baited Trap
 Crashing Timbers
 Death in the Night
 Trail's End
Source:

References

External links

1939 films
American black-and-white films
1930s English-language films
1939 Western (genre) films
Universal Pictures film serials
Films directed by Ford Beebe
American Western (genre) films
Films with screenplays by George H. Plympton
1930s American films